Christos Pappas (Greek: Χρήστος Παππάς; born 1962, Athens) is a Greek politician, convicted criminal and a former deputy leader of the Greek Parliament for the neo-Nazi Golden Dawn party.

Criminal conviction 
After a trial lasting five years, on 22 October 2020, Pappas was sentenced to 13 years and 3 months in prison for administrating a criminal organization. As the Greek Police were not able to track him, it was thought that he may have fled abroad and a European arrest warrant was issued. 

On 1 July 2021, however, he was arrested at an apartment in Central Athens, Greece. Police also arrested a woman on the charge of offering shelter to the wanted criminal.

References

External links
Personal blog
 
 

1962 births
Living people
Golden Dawn (political party) politicians
Greek MPs 2012 (May)
Greek MPs 2012–2014
Politicians from Athens
Greek MPs 2015 (February–August)